Beverly is a carbonated soft drink marketed as a non-alcoholic apéritif, that was produced by The Coca-Cola Company for the Italian market, introduced in 1969. An apéritif is a drink consumed before a meal that is believed to help digestion. Following ongoing product consolidation in the Italian market, Beverly was discontinued in 2009.

The bitter taste of Beverly has become familiar to many Americans who get a chance to try it at Coca-Cola tasting stations at the World of Coca-Cola museums in Atlanta, Georgia and Las Vegas, Nevada, as well as the Coca-Cola Store at Disney Springs and Epcot's Club Cool, both located inside Walt Disney World in Lake Buena Vista and Bay Lake, Florida. Staff there have explained the flavoring ingredient as grapefruit rind, which includes intensely bitter components.

References

External links
Photograph of the Beverly dispenser at World of Coca-Cola

Coca-Cola brands
Italian drinks
Products introduced in 1969
Walt Disney World